The CRH2 Hexie (simplified Chinese: 和谐号; traditional Chinese: 和諧號; pinyin: Héxié Hào; literally: "Harmony") is one of the high-speed train models in China. The CRH2 is based on the E2-1000 Series Shinkansen design from Japan with the license purchased from a consortium formed of Kawasaki Heavy Industries, Mitsubishi Electric, and Hitachi, and represents the second Shinkansen train model to be exported.

However, the newer versions of the CRH2 are not related to the E2-1000 Series despite having the same exterior shell.

Variants

CRH2A 
On October 20, 2004, the Ministry of Railway in China ordered 60 sets of CRH2A trains from Kawasaki Heavy Industries in Japan. Along with 60 sets of Bombardier's Regina-based CRH1A, and 40 sets of Alstom's Pendolino-based CRH5A, these train sets are consider as first batch of CRH trains.

Each of the CRH2A set consists of 8 cars. The first 3 sets (CRH2-001A - CRH2-003A) were built in Japan, the next 6 sets (CRH2-004A - CRH2-009A) were delivered in complete knock down form and assembled by CSR Sifang Locomotive and Rolling Stock. The remaining 51 sets (CRH2-010A - CRH2-060A) were built by Sifang through technology transfer from Japan.

The first train arrived at Qingdao port on March 8, 2006 with little fanfare, and was not even publicized in China.

According to Chinese and Japanese media, CRH2A trains started test trials ahead of commercial operation on the Shanghai-Hangzhou and Shanghai-Nanjing lines on January 28, 2007.

On September 14, 2010, the Chinese MOR ordered additional 40 sets of CRH2A trains (CRH2-151A - CRH2-190A) from CSR Sifang.

CRH2B 

In November 2007, the Ministry of Railway in China ordered 10 CRH2 sets with 16 cars per set (8M8T). These trains have been given designations CRH2B (CRH2-111B - CRH2-120B). Each CRH2B has three 1st seating cars (ZY), twelve 2nd seating cars (ZE), and one dining car (CA).

The first units were delivered on June 29, 2008, and came into service on the Hefei–Nanjing Passenger Railway on August 1, 2008.

CRH2C (CRH2-350) 

Over 50 academics, 150,000 technicians, 600 contractors were involved in the project. This train's livery is not like the CRH2A, which the blue stripe does not end at the fronts of trainsets.

CRH2C stage one

CRH2C Stage one is a modified version of CRH2A. Equipped with an array of the state-of-the-art technologies, including aluminum alloy body with a reduced weight, high speed turntable, high speed pantograph, and optic-fiber based integrated control system.

Chinese MOR ordered 30 sets of CRH2C stage one, name code CRH2-061C - CRH2-090C. The first set, CRH2-061C was unveiled on December 22, 2007.

Together with CRH3C, the CRH2C stage one first came into service on Beijing-Tianjin Intercity high-speed rail on August 1, 2008, and all CRH2C stage one trains have been replaced by CRH3C in April, 2009. Currently, most of these trains are serving on the Shanghai-Nanjing high speed rail.

CRH2C stage two
CRH2C Stage two is the "re-design" version of the CRH2. Some of the details, like the aluminum body structure, noise reduction technology & reduction technique, draw on the CRH3C. According to CSR Sifang, the improvements include the following aspects:
 The thermal capacity of the bogie has been increased, which satisfied the continuous operation at 
 With the YQ-365 type AC traction motor.
 The rigidity of the car body has been increased to lower the noise and vibration.
 Optimized car body and window design for better air tightness and strength.
 Added pressure protection system to avoid pressure fluctuation in the compartment and improvement of comfort.
 Optimized design of the roof antenna, exterior windscreen and windows for a lower air resistance.

Chinese MOR ordered 30 sets of CRH2C stage two, name code CRH2-091C - CRH2-110C and CRH2-141C - CRH2-150C. The first set, CRH2-091C was unveiled in January 2010 and came into service on Zhengzhou-Xi'an high-speed rail in February, 2010.

CRH2E 

In November and December 2007, the Ministry of Railway in China ordered 20 CRH2 sleeper trains with 16 cars per set (8M8T). These trains are modified CRH2Bs, outfitted with traditional railway sleeping berths (couchette car) and have been given designations CRH2E (numbered CRH2-121E - CRH2-140E).
Each CRH2E has thirteen 1st class sleeping cars (WR), two 2nd class seating cars (ZE), and one buffet car (CA) or one second class/dining car (ZEC).

The first batch of CRH2E, CRH2-121E - CRH2-126E, came into service on Beijing-Shanghai railway on December 21, 2008. On 23 July 2011, one sleeper coach on CRH2-139E trainset has been derailed in the 2011 Wenzhou train collision, together with CRH1-046B.

The rest of CRH2Es were deployed on Beijing–Guangzhou–Shenzhen–Hong Kong High-Speed Railway since January 2015, operating overnight sleeper trains between Beijing and Guangzhou (including some trains to Shenzhen).

Double Deck CRH2E
A brand new variant of the CRH2E entered service in 2017 numbered beyond CRH2E-2463. Instead of a traditional railway sleeping berth the sleeper train is organized with the corridor running down the middle of the traincar with double deck "capsules" on each side. Each capsule is similar in layout to airplane first class, and passengers are no longer sharing the room. Each capsule comes with independent tables, outlets, lamps, hangers and curtains. The body of the train is redesigned to reduce noise levels during travel. The trains have been dubbed "moving hotels".

CRH2G 
CRH2G is a specialized cold and sand/windstorm resistant version of the CRH2 manufactured by CRRC Qingdao Sifang. The trains were tested on the Lanzhou–Xinjiang HSR and Harbin–Dalian HSR. Tests where completed on November 10, 2015 and the first sets were assigned to Lanzhou–Xinjiang HSR.

CRH2-380 

CRH2 is one of the fundamental platforms of the new trains, which is designated as CRH380A.

Formation 
At the time of the sixth national railway speed-up, at least 37 CRH2A sets had been delivered by Kawasaki and Sifang. In 2008, all 60 CRH2A sets had been delivered by Kawasaki.

Power Destination
 M - Motor car
 T - Trailer car
 C - Driver cabin
 P - Pantograph

Coach Type
 ZY - First Class Coach
 ZE - Second Class Coach
 ZYE - First Class／Second Class Coach
 ZEC - Second Class Coach／Buffet Car
 CA - Buffet Car
 WR - Soft Sleeper Car
 WRC - Soft Sleeper Car / Dining Coach

CRH2A (Previous) 

  Other train sets
  Set Nº. 2006, 2011 and 2021
  Set Nº. 2015, 2027 and 2030
  Set Nº. 2042
  Set Nº. 2043
  Set Nº. 2044–2060
  Set Nº. 2151–2211. Coach No. 3 has 16 First Class Seats and 43 Second Class seats
  Set Nº. 2212–2416, 2427–2460, 2473–2499, 2828, 4001–4071, 4082–4095 and 4114–4131

CRH2A (Renovated) 

  Set Nº. 2001–2009, 2011–2060 and 2151–2211
  Set Nº. 2212–2416, 2427–2460, 2473–2499, 2828, 4001–4071, 4082–4095 and 4114–4131

CRH2B 

 Set Nº. 2111–2120, 2466–2472 and 4096–4105

CRH2C 

  Set Nº. 2062–2067 and 2069–2090
  Set Nº. 2091–2110 and 2141–2149

CRH2E 

  Set Nº. 2121–2138 and 2140
  Set Nº. 2461 and 2462
  Set Nº. 2463–2465

CRH2G 

 Set Nº. 2417–2426, 4072–4081 and 4106–4113

Accidents 

On July 23rd,  two bullet trains were  traveling in the same direction and the train in front, the CRH 1-046B was stopped by a power failure or a faulty signal hit by lightning. The light that the second train was supposed to stop at was hit by lightning, malfunctioned and showed a green signal while it was supposed to be red. The second train was a CRH 2-139E. The CRH2 front cars fell off the viaduct and one standing at a 90° angle between the viaduct and the ground. The cars that fell to the ground are cars 1-3 and the fourth one was the one standing.

Distribution 
:

See also
 China Railway CRH1
 China Railway CRH3
 China Railway CRH5
 China Railway CRH380A
 China Railway CRH6
 China Railway CIT trains
 List of high-speed trains

References

External links
 

CRH2
Electric multiple units of China
Kawasaki multiple units
CRRC multiple units
Passenger trains running at least at 250 km/h in commercial operations
CSR Sifang Co Ltd.
Passenger trains running at least at 200 km/h in commercial operations
25 kV AC multiple units